Juergensen Marine Inc. is a USA rebreather equipment manufacturer. It was founded in 1996 by Kevin Juergensen. It is a manufacturer of diving rebreathers including electronic-controlled fully closed-circuit rebreathers.

Juergensen Marine has over 2000 Control systems incorporated  into rebreathers worldwide, and its sister company, Juergensen Defense currently conducts business with the US Navy, NATO, Korea, Turkey, and Greece.

The corporate headquarters are located in Addison, Pennsylvania.

External links
 http://www.rebreather.us/ Juergensen Marine Inc.
 https://web.archive.org/web/20110208101525/http://juergensendefense.com/ Juergensen Defense Inc.
 https://web.archive.org/web/20120327223642/http://www.wylandcleanwaterchallenge.org/index.cfm?mid=5&sid=15 Wyland Foundation Who's Who entry for Kevin Juergensen

Diving engineering